The 2015 Grand Rapids mayoral election took place on August 4, 2015 to elect the Mayor of Grand Rapids, Michigan. It saw the election of Rosalynn Bliss.

Bliss became the first female mayor of Grand Rapids.

Incumbent mayor George Heartwell was term-limited.

The election was officially nonpartisan.

If no candidate had received a majority of the vote in the initial round, a runoff election was held between the top-two finishers.

Results

References

Mayoral elections in Grand Rapids, Michigan
2015 Michigan elections
Grand Rapids
Grand Rapids